Paula Rawl Calhoon (born December 6, 1957) is an American politician. She is a member of the South Carolina House of Representatives from the 87th District, serving since 2018. She is a member of the Republican party.

Calhoon serves on the House Education and Public Works Committee and on the Ethics Committee.

Electoral history

References

Living people
1957 births
Republican Party members of the South Carolina House of Representatives
21st-century American politicians
University of South Carolina alumni

Women state legislators in South Carolina